Andrej Mrkela (Serbian Cyrillic: Андреј Мркела; born on April 9, 1992) is a Serbian footballer.

He is the son of former footballer Mitar Mrkela and actress and politician Lidija Vukićević. He was born in Enschede, Netherlands, where his father played for FC Twente at the time.

Andrej signed a one-year loan deal (with an option to buy) with Turkish Süper Lig giants Eskişehirspor on December 26, 2012. He was accompanied by the signing of Goran Čaušić on the same day.

References

External sources
 Profile at Srbijafudbal.
 Andrej Mrkela Stats at Utakmica.rs
 

1992 births
Living people
Footballers from Enschede
Association football midfielders
Serbian footballers
Serbia under-21 international footballers
Red Star Belgrade footballers
FK Rad players
FK Spartak Subotica players
FK Bežanija players
ACS Poli Timișoara players
Eskişehirspor footballers
Serbian First League players
Serbian SuperLiga players
Süper Lig players
Liga II players
Serbian expatriate footballers
Expatriate footballers in Turkey
Serbian expatriate sportspeople in Turkey
Expatriate footballers in Romania
Serbian expatriate sportspeople in Romania